Ernesto Gándara Camou (born 22 September 1960) is a Mexican politician affiliated with the PRI. He currently serves as Senator of the LXII Legislature of the Mexican Congress representing Sonora. He also was municipal president of Hermosillo, Sonora from 2006 to 2009.

See also 
 List of municipal presidents of Hermosillo

References

1960 births
Living people
People from Hermosillo
Politicians from Sonora
Institutional Revolutionary Party politicians
Members of the Senate of the Republic (Mexico)
21st-century Mexican politicians
National Autonomous University of Mexico alumni
Paris 2 Panthéon-Assas University alumni
Municipal presidents in Sonora
Senators of the LXII and LXIII Legislatures of Mexico